Domaszkowice  is a village in the administrative district of Gmina Nysa, within Nysa County, Opole Voivodeship, in south-western Poland.

Before 1945 the area was part of Silesia (Schlesien) Germany and was known as the town of Ritterswalde (Kreis Neisse) (see Territorial changes of Poland after World War II).

The village has a population of 633.

References

Domaszkowice